The Lincolnshire Police and Crime Commissioner is the police and crime commissioner, an elected official tasked with setting out the way crime is tackled by Lincolnshire Police in the English County of Lincolnshire. The post was created in November 2012, following an election held on 15 November 2012, and replaced the Lincolnshire Police Authority.

The first incumbent was Independent candidate, Alan Hardwick, who beat Campaign to Stop Politicians Running Policing candidate, David Bowles, by 4,135 votes after a second ballot. Conservative Richard Davies was third and Labour’s Paul Gleeson came fourth.

The current incumbent is Marc Jones, who represents the Conservative Party.

List of Lincolnshire Police and Crime Commissioners

References

Police and crime commissioners in England